Irene Margaret Clifford (née Blackford) (17 November 1898 – 7 April 1996), known professionally as Colleen Clifford, was a British-born performer, who worked in her native England as well as New Zealand and, later in her career, Australia. As an actress she worked in all facets of the industry: radio, stage, television and film. She was also a theatre founder, director and producer, coloratura soprano, dancer, comedian and classical pianist who was a specialist in voice production, drama and music. She was also a commercial advertiser, spokeswoman and charity worker and released her own memoirs. She worked across stage and screen with stars including Laurence Olivier, Noël Coward and Bette Davis, and trained Australian actors such as Judy Nunn, Paula Duncan and Melissa George.

Clifford started her career in her native United Kingdom where she was an early radio and television performer for the British Broadcasting Corporation during the 1930s and 1940s hosting cabaret and variety shows, and appearing in West End theatre and during the Second World War, becoming a feature of news broadcasting and war concerts. Clifford was, at one time, featured on a 15-minute radio show showcasing her singing and musical performances. She emigrated to Australia in 1954, and from 1955 became a highly recognisable character actress of stage, television and films, from the early 1970s in soap operas, series, mini-series, telemovies and theatrical features, often portraying eccentric elderly women. She was a grand dame and matriarch of the arts and entertainment industry. She appeared in her last role at 93 years of age and as such, alongside Olga Dickie and Queenie Ashton was one of the oldest working actors in Australia, she died aged 97.

Biography

Early life and career in England
Born in Taunton, Somerset, England as  Irene Margaret Blackford to an English-born mother and George Taunton Constable Clifford, a Major in the British army, who served in his regiment worldwide including France and Belgium, at which time Clifford was raised by an aunt in London. She had two brothers. Her paternal grandfather from Somerset also served in the army as a Major and was a recipient of the VC, her paternal youngest uncle, Ned was killed in the Boer War. Clifford although based in London, lived in various parts of England including Farnham, Stropeshire, Surrey, Kensington and Cornwall, as well as New Zealand during her childhood, where her father worked as a cadet on a stock station in Masterton, before purchasing a run in Taranaki. She studied classical piano in Belgium at the Brussels Conservatoire, before receiving a scholarship to the Royal Academy in London, but stating musical theatre was favoured more, she curtailed a musical career, to become active in British theatre as a stage performer for almost thirty years, starting with a production of Hubert Henry Davies, The Mollusc. She emigrated to Perth, Australia in 1954, after the death of her husband who was a Major in The Royal Air Force.

Career in Australia

Theatre career
She continued her theatrical career after emigrating to Australia, where she founded the Perth Theatre Guild and Drama School and as a side project taught voice production, drama and music, where throughout the next fifteen years she help develop and train talent for the theatre. She staged six successful musicals using entirely local talent and without importing professional actors. These included stage productions of Annie Get Your Gun (1959), starring Leone Martin Smith in the title role, Oklahoma (1961) and South Pacific (1962) at His Majesty's Theatre, Perth. She moved to Sydney in 1969, where she appeared often at the Old Tote Theatre in theatre roles, including "A Nightingale Still At It"

Television roles
Clifford having moved from Perth to Sydney and remaining appearing in theatre roles, she began appearing in plays for the Australian Broadcasting Corporation and taking on regular television and film roles. Clifford became a highly recognizably actress in her latter years appearing in everything from soap opera, miniseries, telemovies and films. She made her television acting debut in 1971 as a guest star in the series Dynasty (not related to the American production) and The Godfathers in 1971. While touring in New Zealand in 1972, Clifford fell ill and was unable to perform for the first few shows. Being under a "no play, no pay" policy with the theatre company, meaning payment would be withheld from an actor during an illness, she was forced to remain in her Wellington apartment with no means of support. Clifford was then in her late-70s and, with rent money and doctor bills piling up, Michael Craig, and Honor Blackman and other members of the company raised enough money to financially support Clifford until she was well enough to rejoin the cast.

In 1978, she guest starred on legal drama Case for the Defence. A year later, she appeared in the popular series Prisoner (also known as Prisoner: Cell Block H) in a brief but memorable role as Edie Wharton, an elderly woman imprisoned for vagrancy. That same year, she made another guest appearance on another soap opera the Nine Network series The Young Doctors. She took a three-year absence to return to the theatre full-time but, then in 1981, began playing the guest role of Miss Bird on A Country Practice. She appeared in supporting roles including the sitcom Mother and Son and Five Mile Creek throughout the 1980s.

Films
She started to feature in small roles in films from the 1980s onwards, firstly the historical drama film Careful, He Might Hear You (1983). She spent the next decade starring in a variety of supporting roles in film. These included  Where the Green Ants Dream (1984), The Coca-Cola Kid (1985), Double Sculls (1986), The Year My Voice Broke (1987) and Barracuda (1988).

Return to theatre
In 1990, the 92-year-old Clifford starred in the latest version of her one-woman show A Nightingale Still at It in Berkeley Square. She was awarded the John Campbell Fellowship for her contribution to theatre two years later.

Later roles in television and film
She returned to serial A Country Practice playing 2 different roles; Freda Spinner and Mrs. Grainger between 1990 and 1993; in that same year, she starred in films This Won't Hurt a Bit and Frauds (1993) Clifford suffered a heart attack in 1995, and was fitted with a pacemaker, she died in Sydney, Australia on 7 April 1996, at the age of 97.

Filmography
Clifford had a long career in England, particularly in theatre before emigrating to Australia in 1954; the following documents her Australian credits only, where Clifford had a successful career in television and films as an actress and also appeared in theatre, as well as was a theatre director and teacher in Australia. She made her stage debut in 1955 and her screen debut in 1959 in TV series Spotlight, the first production in Western Australia, and her final film appearance in 1993.

FILM

TELEVISION

References

Further reading
Amadio, Nadine. "Never To Old." The Bulletin. 112.5725–5733 (1990): 90–91.
Blackman, Barbara. "Colleen Clifford interviewed by Barbara Blackman". National Library of Australia, 1985.
Blundell, Graeme. Australian Theatre: Backstage with Graeme Blundell. Melbourne: Oxford University Press, 1997. 
Deveson, Anne. Coming of Age: Twenty-One Interviews About Growing Older. Newham, Victoria: Scribe Publications, 1994.

External links

1898 births
1996 deaths
English film actresses
English soap opera actresses
English stage actresses
English television actresses
Australian film actresses
Australian soap opera actresses
Australian stage actresses
People from Taunton
English people of Irish descent
20th-century English actresses
British emigrants to Australia
British Roman Catholics
20th-century British businesspeople